Herb Di Gioia is an Italian, American documentary film director who pioneered the field of "observational cinema" in his work and impacted ethnographic film making through his contributions as a teacher at Britain’s National Film and Television School. Di Gioia's films are recognized as a significant departure from the better-known works of other observational documentarians, like David and Judith MacDougall.

Work
The UCLA-educated Di Gioia was not an anthropologist by profession, but was drawn to the field by an interest in exploring the lives of ordinary people. In the early 1970s, Di Gioia and his partner David Hancock became involved in the work of filmmaker Norman Miller, upon whom the National Science Foundation had bestowed a grant to produce a film series examining global ecological zones. Di Gioia and Hancock produced several films in Afghanistan which were incorporated into the Faces of Change Collection.

After the death of his partner, Di Gioia focused predominantly on teaching, training anthropologyand filmmaking students at the University of Illinois Chicago's Visual Anthropology MA program in the Anthropology Department in the mid to late 1970's, then at the National Film and Television School in ethnographic filmmaking.

See also
John Marshall
Robert Gardner
Tim Asch

Notes

Filmography
 Afghan Nomads (1974)
 Afghan Village (1974)
 Naim and Jabar (1974)
 Wheat Cycle (1975)
 Peter and Jane Flint (1981)
 Peter Murray (1981)
 Duwayne Masure (1981)
 Chester Grimes (1981)

Related links
 Faces of Change: Afghan Series
 BFI Film & TV database: Di Gioia, Herbert

American documentary film directors
American anthropologists
Visual anthropologists
Living people
Year of birth missing (living people)